The Queensland Railways B17 class locomotive was a class of 4-6-0 steam locomotives operated by the Queensland Railways.

History
Between May 1911 and May 1914 North Ipswich Railway Workshops built 21 4-6-0 locomotives. Per Queensland Railway's classification system they were designated the B17 class, B representing they had three driving axles, and the 17 the cylinder diameter in inches. In October 1917, 678 was superheated. Although judged a success, no more followed.

References

Railway locomotives introduced in 1911
B17
3 ft 6 in gauge locomotives of Australia
4-6-0 locomotives